Michał Olejniczak (born 31 January 2001) is a Polish handball player for Industria Kielce and the Polish national team.

He represented Poland at the 2020 European Men's Handball Championship.

References

External links

2001 births
Living people
Sportspeople from Gorzów Wielkopolski
Polish male handball players
Vive Kielce players
21st-century Polish people